Branoslavci is a village in the Municipality of Ljutomer in northeastern Slovenia. The area traditionally belonged to the Styria region and is now included in the Mura Statistical Region.

There is a small Neo-Gothic chapel in the centre of the village.  It was built in the late 19th century.

In the south of the settlement is a large mansion known as Branek Castle. The surviving building is a two-storey early 20th-century adaptation after a major fire in 1925 of what was a 16th-century castle, which had in turn developed on the site of a tower of an early Slavic defence enclosure.

References

External links
Branoslavci on Geopedia

Populated places in the Municipality of Ljutomer